The 1990 UTEP Miners football team was an American football team that represented the University of Texas at El Paso in the Western Athletic Conference during the 1990 NCAA Division I-A football season. In their second year under head coach David Lee, the team compiled a 3–8 record.

Schedule

References

UTEP
UTEP Miners football seasons
UTEP Miners football